Pieris mannii (southern small white) is a butterfly in the family Pieridae.

The length of the forewings is 19–25 mm. The butterfly flies from March to October depending on the location.

The larva feeds on  Cruciferae, especially Iberis sempervirens and Sinapis.

Identification
Compared to Pieris rapae, the cabbage-pest small white, the forewing spot is larger and squarish or even crescent-shaped rather than round. The apex marking extends further down the outer margin, reaching as far as the spot.

Range
Until recently P. mannii has been confined to South Europe, Asia Minor, Morocco and  Syria. It was first found north of the Alps in France and in Germany in 2008 and has since gradually extended its range in these two countries. It was first sighted in the southern Netherlands in 2015.

References

External links 
 Moths and Butterflies of Europe and North Africa 
Pieris, Funet.fi

mannii
Butterflies described in 1851
Butterflies of Europe